Alkmaar Noord railway station is a suburban railway station in the town of Alkmaar, Netherlands. The station opened on 26 September 1980 and is located on the Den Helder–Amsterdam railway. The train services are operated by Nederlandse Spoorwegen.

Train services
The station is served by the following service(s):

2x per hour Intercity services Schagen - Alkmaar - Amsterdam - Utrecht - Eindhoven - Maastricht (peak hours only)
2x per hour Intercity services Den Helder - Alkmaar - Amsterdam - Utrecht - Arnhem - Nijmegen
2x per hour Local services (Sprinter) Hoorn - Alkmaar - Uitgeest - Haarlem - Amsterdam

Bus services
The following bus services are operated by Connexxion and call at the station.

 3 - Daalmeer - De Mare - Noord Station - Station
 4 - Daalmeer - Koedijk - De Mare - Vroonermeer - Noord Station - Station - Centre - MCA Hospital - Overdie
 8 - Station - Noord Station - Beverkoog

References

External links

NS website 
Dutch public transport travel planner 

Railway stations in North Holland
Railway stations opened in 1980
Railway stations on the Staatslijn K